The  was a Roman unit of length, weight, and volume. It survived as the Byzantine liquid ounce (oungía) and the origin of the English inch, ounce, and fluid ounce.

See also
 Ancient Roman weights and measures

References

Units of length
Human-based units of measurement
Ancient Roman units of measurement